Mengke Bateer (pronounced ; born November 20, 1975), commonly referred to simply as Bateer in China, is a Chinese Inner Mongolian former professional basketball player. Playing at the center position, he played parts of three seasons in the NBA, winning the NBA Finals during one of them. However, he spent the majority of his career competing in the Chinese Basketball Association for the Beijing Ducks as the winner of the CBA finals and later, with the Xinjiang Flying Tigers before ending his career with the Sichuan Blue Whales in the lesser National Basketball League. Mengke scored a total of 8 points with the Toronto Raptors on his last season in the NBA.

Background
Mengke Bateer is a Chinese Mongol residing in China's Inner Mongolia Autonomous Region. Like most of the Mongols, he does not have a family name, and his full name is a composition of two words: Mönkh (Eternal) and Baatar (Hero). In Mandarin, he is simply referred to as Ba Te Er. He is also sometimes affectionately called "Da Ba" (大巴), with Da translating into English as "big", and Ba representing the first character of his name in Mandarin.

At 210 cm and 132 kg, Bateer was a strong center widely respected as an accomplished screen-setter and passer, despite being severely hindered over the years by a lack of speed. His prowess as a passer was put on full display during one of his earliest NBA games when he dished out six assists against the Chicago Bulls on March 30, 2002.

As of his official retirement in 2015, Bateer holds two notable distinctions. He is the only Chinese basketball player to have played in the NBA without being selected in any NBA draft. He is also the first Chinese basketball player, and one of only two overall, to have been on an NBA championship-winning roster, as he was a member of the San Antonio Spurs when they won the NBA championship in 2003. The only other Chinese player to accomplish this is Sun Yue, who was a member of the Los Angeles Lakers when they won the NBA championship in 2009. Bateer was also the first player of Asian descent to win an NBA title.

Both Bateer and Sun would later end up with the 2014 CBA champion Beijing Ducks, making them the first, and so far only, winners of both the NBA Finals and CBA Finals.

Bateer was also the first-ever Chinese player to start in an NBA game when he joined the Denver Nuggets in 2002.  Yao Ming would become the second Chinese player to do so later in that year and Wang Zhizhi, despite being the first-ever Chinese player to join the league, did not start in a game until years later.

Early basketball career 
Brought up through the youth ranks by the Beijing Ducks, Mengke Bateer made his debut for China's national basketball team prior to the 1994 Asian Games, at the age of 18. Three years later, although a regular member of the playing rotation, he was removed from the national squad due to "disciplinary problems" as reported in the media. Often presented to the public as a filial son, Bateer would attempt several times over the course of his career to leave his teams, and return to his family.

While training with China's national team in 1999, Bateer was invited to play in a pre-draft tournament held in Phoenix, where he suffered from jet lag and did not impress the scouts in attendance. He also made a brief appearance at another pre-draft venue, in Treviso, Italy. But he would have to wait several more years to play in the NBA, staying with the Ducks from the 1997–98 CBA season through the 2001–02 season, and earning MVP honors at the 2002 CBA All-Star Game.

NBA career

Denver Nuggets (2002) 
In October 2001, Bateer joined the Denver Nuggets for the team's preseason training camp. He was dropped after two preseason games, but in March 2002, already deep into the 2001–02 NBA season, he rejoined the team, as the Nuggets were in desperate need of a player with big stature after trading Raef LaFrentz. This made him the second Chinese player to compete in the NBA after Wang Zhizhi, who had made his debut for the Dallas Mavericks a year earlier. He was also the first undrafted Chinese player in NBA history.

Bateer played in Denver's final 25 games of the season, averaging 5.5 points while battling fouls from opponents. Due to the shortage of the players with big stature in the Nuggets roster, he also ended up in the starting 10 of those contests, becoming the first Chinese player to ever start an NBA game, as Wang never made it into the starting line-up during his time with the Mavericks.

San Antonio Spurs (2002–2003) 
In summer 2002, Bateer was traded to the Detroit Pistons, along with Don Reid, for Rodney White and a future first-round pick. But after an impressive show against Team USA at the 2002 FIBA World Championship in Indianapolis, where he scored 19 points (also leading China in scoring in five of seven games during the tournament) for a squad that also included the just-drafted Yao Ming, Team USA assistant coach Gregg Popovich, who was also the head coach of the San Antonio Spurs, decided to take a chance on Bateer and acquired him in exchange for a second-round pick.

Despite playing only occasionally with the Spurs, Bateer was nonetheless a member of San Antonio's 2002–03 championship team.

Toronto Raptors (2003–2004) 
The following season, Bateer signed as a free agent with the Toronto Raptors, but was transferred later in the 2003–04 NBA season to the Orlando Magic, who waived him three days later. In October 2004, the New York Knicks signed Bateer as a training camp invitee, but waived him prior to the start of the 2004–05 NBA season. After being waived by the Knicks, Bateer played for the Huntsville Flight of the National Basketball Development League, now known as the NBA G League, for a while, before deciding to return to China.

NBA career statistics

Return to China
Mengke Bateer rejoined the Beijing Ducks in the Chinese Basketball Association in mid-February 2005, a couple of weeks before the end of the 2004–05 CBA season, and was named MVP of the 2005 CBA All-Star Game, which was held in Nanjing on March 7, after the regular season concluded. He scored a contest-best 28 points while leading the North to a 103–99 victory over the South.

During the 2005–06 CBA season, Bateer helped Beijing win a then-franchise-best CBA North Division title, while averaging 25 points, 11 rebounds, and 5 assists per game. He was originally chosen to be named the league's Regular Season MVP, but he had the honor vacated due to a rule forbidding players who were slapped with suspensions from receiving any awards (earlier in the season, he incurred the heaviest fine in CBA history for arguing with a referee, and sat out two games as a result).

Bateer then missed the 2006–07 CBA season due to injuries, and subsequently moved from the Ducks to the Xinjiang Flying Tigers, where he spent the next six years of his career. During his time in Xinjiang, he became the first player to ever "three-peat" as CBA Most Valuable Player, winning the honor in 2009, 2010, and 2011. The Flying Tigers also advanced to the CBA Finals in each of those years, but failed to win the title, falling to the Guangdong Southern Tigers on all three occasions.

After a brief stint with the Sichuan Blue Whales in China's lower-tier NBL in summer 2013, just as the team was preparing join the CBA, Bateer returned to the Beijing Ducks for the 2013–14 CBA season. More of a role player by that point in his career, he nonetheless provided an occasionally useful presence in the front court for Beijing, and helped the Ducks win their second CBA title.

National team career
Mengke Bateer competed for China in the Summer Olympic Games at Atlanta 1996, Sydney 2000, and Athens 2004. He also represented the PRC at the 2002 FIBA World Championship in Indianapolis, in addition to being a member of his country's national team for a number of FIBA Asia Championship, Asian Games, and East Asian Games competitions, as well as the 2001 Summer Universiade in Beijing. The trio of 7'6" Yao Ming, 7'1" Wang Zhizhi, and 6'11" Bateer were known by some fans and commentators as, the "Walking Great Wall."

Retirement
Looking to stay in shape, Bateer played briefly with NBL team Shaanxi Weinan Xingda in the summer of 2014, but did not compete during the 2014–15 CBA season. Some reports in the Chinese media stated that he was struggling with complications from the onset of diabetes. On August 11, 2015, he was honored with an official retirement ceremony held at the Beijing Wukesong Culture & Sports Center. The event was attended by former national team squadmates Wang Zhizhi, Du Feng, Wang Shipeng, and Zhu Fangyu, as well as NBA legend Hakeem Olajuwon. Yao Ming sent a videotaped farewell message and the evening climaxed with Bateer's number 9 jersey being lifted to the arena's rafters.

Filmography

References

External links
 Mengke Bateer Stats - Basketball-Reference.com
 NBA D-League Bio

1975 births
Living people
21st-century Chinese male actors
2002 FIBA World Championship players
Asian Games gold medalists for China
Asian Games medalists in basketball
Asian Games silver medalists for China
Basketball players at the 1996 Summer Olympics
Basketball players at the 1998 Asian Games
Basketball players at the 2000 Summer Olympics
Basketball players at the 2002 Asian Games
Basketball players at the 2004 Summer Olympics
Basketball players from Inner Mongolia
Beijing Ducks players
Centers (basketball)
Chinese expatriate basketball people in Canada
Chinese expatriate basketball people in the United States
Chinese male film actors
Chinese men's basketball players
Chinese people of Mongolian descent
Denver Nuggets players
Huntsville Flight players
Male actors from Inner Mongolia
Medalists at the 1998 Asian Games
Medalists at the 2002 Asian Games
National Basketball Association players from China
Olympic basketball players of China
People from Ordos City
San Antonio Spurs players
Sichuan Blue Whales players
Toronto Raptors players
Universiade medalists in basketball
Universiade silver medalists for China
Xinjiang Flying Tigers players
Medalists at the 2001 Summer Universiade